Mirian Modebadze is a Georgian rugby union player. He plays as Wing for AIA Kutaisi in the Georgia Championship.
He was called into the Georgia U20 squad for 2017 World Rugby Under 20 Championship.

References

1997 births
Living people
Rugby union players from Georgia (country)
Georgia international rugby union players
The Black Lion players
Rugby union fullbacks
Rugby union wings